Military markings on United States army vehicles were upgraded in August 1942 when specific new rules were adopted. New marks, from the national identification symbol downwards were ordered to be put on "all motor vehicles assigned to tactical units".

History 

During World War I, the letters US or U.S. were used to identify vehicles of the American Expeditionary Forces. Formation signs and War Department vehicle identification numbers were painted on the sides.
United States Army Ambulance Service vehicles carried a red cross and the Caduceus symbol which had been adopted by the U.S. Medical Department in 1902. War Department vehicle numbers were put on vehicles as was section identification signs, SSU meaning services support unit, with 2 or 3 digit number (e.g. SSU 525). Between the wars a standard vehicle serial number was introduced. An insignia USA W-????? (W for War Department) was used, the first or first two numbers indicating the vehicle type, the rest of the numbers being sequence numbers. All symbols were painted in white. A prefix K was used by the US Signal Corps on certain special vehicles.

National identification 

 Three colored star, circle with blue background and white five pointed star with a red circle, that does not touch the blue background. Used pre-war and is identical to the marking on aircraft.
 Three colored star, as per two color star with a red circle, that does not touch the blue background.
 National flag, used predominately on vehicles in North African landing from November 1942 were painted in the sides of softskins bonnets and on the front and sides of armor.
 Two color star – circle with blue background and white five pointed star used in North Africa from late 1942.
 Star and stripe - bar, five pointed star and bar. Saw service in North Africa, Sicily and to a lesser extent, the SW Pacific. Used on tanks with the bar circling the turret with a star on each side. 22 inch diameter star. From January to August 1942 the star and bar was painted in air corps yellow.

Army regulation AR-850-5 issued August 1942 ordered a plain white five pointed star, as the national symbol, it was seen in all theatres from 1943 and by 1944 was the most common national identification sign. The star point was supposed to be facing rearwards on flat surfaces, upwards on a glacis.

In armored units, the white star was often painted out or a circle around the star was added, to avoid looking like a German cross at distance. 2nd Armored painted the vehicle number on the turret side in yellow for the same reason in Normandy, with the numbers being removed by D+14.

The August 1942 regulations authorised, when camouflage and concealment outweighed recognition requirements, the national insignia could be dulled, painted over with olive drab lacklustre gasoline solvent paint, or covered. 

note: (l) left, (c) centre (r) right

March 1944 Army Regulations gave permission for the national sign to be that chosen by the respective service command, allowing USMC and Army Air Forces to create their own.

Formation signs 

Formation signs on plates 6 inches high and 9 inches wide, located front right and rear left, were standard until the end of 1941 when they were limited to staff cars and Jeeps in the Army. Most in the form of a shield and ribbon with a motto.

Army Regulation AR-850-5 issued August 1942 set out a standard bumper code which came in four groupings.

Group 1

Group 2

The dash in front of I and O is to avoid confusion with numbers

Group 3

Unusual service units could invent their own 1-3 letter code.

Group 4 serial number of the vehicle

The Serial number of the vehicle in normal order of march. Vehicles assigned to headquarters will be grouped with HQ vehicles and given small serial numbers. It was normal to adopt a convoy order number in a logical format, HQ vehicles would be numbered 1-10, 1st platoon 11-20, 2nd platoon 21-30 etc.

Stencilled in white, max 4 inches high, front and back of the vehicle, groupings were separated by a one-inch dash. Groups three and four may be on the opposite end of the bumper. If put into two lines, Group 1 was over Group 2, and Group 3 over Group 4. A trailer would carry the same bumper number of its towing vehicle.

Tactical signs 

The August 1942 regulations set out the rules surrounding tactical markings:

Divisions, independent brigades, combat commands and combat teams may prescribe tactical markings for their command. Painted on the vehicles they may be in color, their location, size and design using geometric shapes to be specified. To be changed in a combat zone when appropriate with no written record of the system.

Painted on turrets or hull sides of Armored Fighting Vehicles (AFV), on bumpers of halftracks and softskins.

They included: 
One digit numbers in 1st Armored Division in North Africa painted in black alongside the tactical sign. 
One or two letters and one or two numbers such as B-18 or DT-7, as large as possible. 
Triangles, oblongs and circles in various combinations and formats designed to identify vehicles down to platoon level.

Names on vehicles 
Vehicle names were authorised and used on AFV's as a form of tactical sign, often using names starting with the same letter to designate vehicles of the same platoon or company.

Battles, places, people and girls names were common.

Non formation signs

War department number 

The 1929 system of unique war department number was allocated by the Army Quartermaster Corps. Until mid 1944 a prefix of W- for War Dept. was used. Australian produced vehicles for US use in the Pacific theatre had a prefix of U. A K- prefix indicated a U.S. Signal Corps designation.

From January 1944, a vehicle where the engine was suppressed to reduce radio interference had an S painted after the number either side of the bonnet.

Prefix numbers indicated the type of vehicle.

† For trucks without hoods, numbers to be painted on each end of drivers seat.

The first 99,999 jeeps had five digit numbers after the prefix, thereafter six digit numbers.

Army vehicle numbers were preceded by USA or US ARMY, normally appearing on a line above the number in same color and size as the number. If there was room, it could all appear in one line. For Marine Corps vehicles, substitute USMC. The 1942 regulations (AR-850-5) required U.S.A. over the 5 or 6 digit number.

The April 22, 1942 regulation also specified that the numbers were to be painted using a stencil in blue drab lustreless enamel with numbers one inch high on motorcycles, two inches on trailers and US registration plates and four inches high and two inches wide on all other vehicles.

The April 22, 1942 regulation on color were amended and from 1943 the numbers were prescribed to be painted white, as blue drab was too hard to see.

The 1945 regulations specified white lacklustre, stencilling, enamel paint with numbers on both sides of the hood close to the vertical surface so the number can be read from the side and on the rear of the vehicle, where space permits with heights of letters varying from 1 inch to 4 inch, with the largest size practical to be used.

Aerial recognition symbols

The official aerial recognition would become the plain white five pointed star on a horizontal surface or glacis that was used for national identification.

During 1942-3 when a thick white band appeared around turrets of AFV's in North Africa, the Pacific and in the UK.

White five pointed star with a circle around, often broken at the points, per the stencil, was in common use by July 1943 in horizontal surfaces, except in the Pacific theatre.

Vehicles landing in Sicily were ordered to change the aerial recognition by painting a yellow circle around the white star, sometimes the circle was thickened and the star size reduced.

Bridge plates

All vehicles had a bridge rating, the US regulations in 1942 and 1943 did not specify a system. In practice the British system was adopted. The rating was displayed on a yellow circle, with black writing. The circle was for most vehicles on an attached plate, 6 inches to 9 inches diameter. Tanks and many other AFV's had the marking painted on their hull. The location is on the front, often attached to the right fender, sometimes attached to radiators.

The number equated to the bridge category, very roughly based on weight with adjustments for axel loading and impact factors, rounded up. Where the vehicle normally has a trailer, the writing showed two numbers, the upper being the loaded vehicle with the loaded trailer, the lower just the loaded vehicle.

A Jeep, if it had a trailer, would have 3/2. Jeeps and motorbikes did not have bridge plates, they fell into categories 1 or 2.

In the field, the bright yellow sign facing forward was considered too visible so was often toned down, repainted as a yellow hollow circle or discarded.

In February 1945 US regulations specified the US system to be black numbers on a yellow eight inch square, or 8x6 rectangular plate fastened to right of centre front bumper. AFV's on front level with top of tracks, half tracks and scout cars on right fender. Amphibious right front. Numbers used the same system for towing vehicles on tractor plus tow over tractor rating. It does not appear that in Europe this was adopted before the end of the war there.

Other markings

Regimental insignia 

Regimental crests were common between the wars and continued until 1941, still appearing in 1943 and 1944 amongst artillery, cavalry and independent companies. These unofficial colored signs were placed on the sides of vehicles.

Rank 

Vehicles of General Officers carried a plate 6 inches high by 9 inches wide on the front right and left rear bumpers, painted red and bearing up to five white five pointed stars. Covered up or removed when vehicle was not carrying the general. Flags were an alternate, flown on right front wing of cars.

Left hand drive 
US Army vehicles sent to the UK had:
 CAUTION over LEFT HAND over DRIVE or 
 LEFT HAND over DRIVE over NO HAND SIGNALS

The letters were two or three inches high on the rear. These signs were normally retained when the vehicle was shipped to Europe.

Speed limit 

A sign MAX SPEED and the number in one inch letters was stencilled on the front dash board, using the same paint as the vehicle serial number.

Shipping and rail loading marks 

Shipping stencils applied before shipping from the USA. Up to five lines giving length and width in inches, shipping and combat weight in pounds and any other relevant information. In one or two inch white letters on the olive drab paint or sometimes on a mat black panel.

Tire pressure 

A stencil print with T.P. and the number (35 for Jeeps) was either put on the inside on the dashboard or inside the wheel well.

Anti-freeze
When anti-freeze was put in a radiator PRESTONE with a year was stencilled on the hood above the radiator grill, 43 indicating winter 43/44. ½ to 1 inch letters in white.

No smoking 
Signs with NO SMOKING were put on vehicles transporting inflammable liquids

Convoy markings
A visibility patch comprising three vertical white stripes and four alternate black stripes was often painted on a rear fender to aid station keeping.

Personalised markings
Personalised slogans, words, names and pictures of pin up girls and Disney characters were discouraged but evident on many vehicles in wartime photos. February 1945 regulations stated that “caricatures, cartoons, coats of arms and symbolic figures are not authorised.”

Specialist vehicles

Ambulance 

The 1942 regulations specified Geneva cross, bright red on a snow-white field. Cross to be eighteen inches and each limb to be a six-inch square, in centre of side of body. On the roof the red cross on a white background to reach both sides. Above the visor, white letters AMBULANCE with a small red cross on white background either side, it can be on windscreen but not to interfere with drivers visibility. On each rear door, below the window, a six-inch cross on an eight-inch white field. All writing in white to be properly shaded to give depth.

A six-inch caduceus in maroon to be painted on both sides of the rear body, below the lower moulding, seven inches to the rear of the front body. Under which in one inch letters UNITED STATES over ARMY. All paints to be lustreless enamel.

Dangerous cargoes
Vehicles carrying explosives displayed the word EXPLOSIVES in three inch white letters on a red placard at the front, rear and on both sides. Bumpers were painted red.

Fuel tankers refuelling aircraft in 1945 were painted chrome yellow, and had black letters. Army olive-drab tankers had white letters. Signs displayed were OCTAINE GASOLINE and NO SMOKING WITHIN 50 FEET.

Military Police 

All Jeeps used by Military Police had MILITARY POLICE in three inch black letters around the circumference of a sixteen-inch white disc that was in the centre of the spare wheel at the rear. A similar sign was also painted below the windscreen. On motorcycles MILITARY POLICE appeared in white or black on the canvas part of the windshield in white, or in black on a white band.

Animal drawn 
1942 regulations stated that vehicles drawn by animals, including canvas cover vehicles to be marked U.S.A. using a stencil in lacklustre blue paint, generally on both sides and tailgate. Veterinary ambulances carry a green cross.

See also

 British military vehicle markings of World War II

References

External links
 1942 Army Regulations

World War II vehicles of the United States
United States Army vehicles
Vehicle markings